Blood, Passion and Coffee is a 2019 Honduran drama film directed by Carlos Membreño. It was selected as the Honduran entry for the Best International Feature Film at the 92nd Academy Awards, but it was not nominated.

Plot
Based on real events, a coffee producing family in Marcala fights to keep their farm.

Cast
 Alejandra Arias as Nancy
 Enrique Barrientos as Oscar Matute
 Ethel Flores as Marcelina de Matute
 Carlos Alberto Moncada as Roger Matute

See also
 List of submissions to the 92nd Academy Awards for Best International Feature Film
 List of Honduran submissions for the Academy Award for Best International Feature Film

References

External links
 

2019 films
2019 drama films
Honduran films
2010s Spanish-language films